Danxiaorchis is a genus of flowering plants belonging to the family Orchidaceae.

Its native range is Southeastern China.

Species:

Danxiaorchis singchiana 
Danxiaorchis yangii

References

Orchids
Orchid genera